The Anglican Diocese of Oleh is one of 12 within the Anglican Province of Bendel, itself one of 14 provinces within the Church of Nigeria. The  current bishop is John Usiwoma Aruakpor.

References 

Church of Nigeria dioceses
Dioceses of the Province of Bendel